The 2016 Men's U23 South American Volleyball Championship was the second edition of the tournament, organised by South America's governing volleyball body, the Confederación Sudamericana de Voleibol (CSV).

Preliminary round

Pool A

|}

|}

Pool B

|}

|}

Final round

5th–6th place

|}

Final four

Semifinals

|}

3rd place match

|}

Final

|}

Final standing

All-Star Team

Most Valuable Player

Best Setter

Best Opposite Spiker

Best Outside Spikers

 

Best Middle Blockers

Best Libero

See also
2016 Women's U23 South American Volleyball Championship

External links
CSV official website

Men's South American Volleyball Championships
S